Datudingzi Mountain or Datudingzi Shan, also known as Mount Datudingzi,  abbreviated as "Mt. Datudingzi", is the highest point of Heilongjiang province , located about 170 kilometers southeast of Wuchang County,  Harbin City, Heilongjiang Province. 

Datudingzi Mountain is one of the peaks in Zhangguangcai Range (张广才岭),  and is also the highest mountain in Heilongjiang Province, with the main peak of 1690 meters above sea level.

Natural Geography
Datudingzi Mountain is located on the southeast slope of the Zhangguangcai Range. The plant growing period in this area is 120-140 days, the annual precipitation is 500-1000mm, the average annual temperature is 2.7℃, and the snow accumulation time in winter is 130-150 days.

References

Harbin
One-thousanders of Asia
Mountains of Heilongjiang